Borax is Sodium borate, a boron-containing mineral.

Borax may also refer to:
Borax (mineral), the naturally occurring mineral
Borax, Nevada, a ghost town in the United States
Sodium perborate, another boron-containing mineral.
BORAX experiments, a series of tests using the BORAX-I nuclear reactor
Pacific Coast Borax Company

See also
Borax Smith, Francis Marion Smith, an American business magnate
20 Mule Team Borax